Ernst Otto Wilhelm Taschenberg (23 March 1854, Halle - 20 March 1923, Halle) was a German entomologist who specialised in Hymenoptera.

He was the son of Ernst Ludwig Taschenberg. From 1879, after studying zoology at the universities of Leipzig and Halle, he worked alongside his father at the zoological institute in Halle. After his father's death, he became curator (Kustos) of the Institute's museum and professor of entomology.

He worked on all Hymenoptera but mainly Cynipidae. His collections are held by Halle University (Biozentrum).

In 1896–97, he edited the popular science journal Die Natur.

Works
 Die Verwandlungen der Tiere. Freytag, Leipzig 1882 Digital edition by the University and State Library Düsseldorf
 Bilder aus dem Tierleben. Freytag, Leipzig 1885 Digital edition by the University and State Library Düsseldorf
 Die giftigen Tiere: Ein Lehrbuch für Zoologen, Mediziner und Pharmazeuten; mit 68 Abb . Enke, Stuttgart 1909 Digital edition by the University and State Library Düsseldorf

References
 Andreas Daum, Wissenschaftspopularisierung im 19. Jahrhundert: Bürgerliche Kultur, naturwissenschaftliche Bildung und die deutsche Öffentlichkeit, 1848–1914. Munich: Oldenbourg, 1998, .
 Moritz, G.; Schneider, K.; Heidecke, D. & Neumann, V. 2004 "Die Geschichte der Entomologie am Institut für Zoologie der Martin-Luther-Universität Halle-Wittenberg". Mitt. Dt. Ges. allg. angew. Ent. 14 21–30, 18 Fig.27, Portrait
 Osborn, H. 1952 A Brief History of Entomology Including Time of Demosthenes and Aristotle to Modern Times with over Five Hundred Portraits. Columbus, Ohio, The Spahr & Glenn Company .

External links
 History of entomology at Halle in German

German entomologists
Hymenopterists
1854 births
1923 deaths